The Coast Town Kids is a 1980 Australian TV movie. It was the pilot for a TV series.

Cast
 John Woods as Tom Wilde
 Frank Gallacher as Len Wolding
Alan Hopgood as Mick James
 Peter Felmingham as Fred Farrell
 Robert Korosy as Peter Martin
 Sally Wilde as Missy Martin
 Justin Stanford as Skinny

References

External links

Australian television films
1980 television films
1980 films
1980s English-language films
1980s Australian films